Ilanga discus is a species of sea snail, a marine gastropod mollusk in the family Solariellidae.

Description
The size of the shell attains 10 mm.

Distribution
This species occurs in the Indian Ocean off KwaZuluNatal, South Africa, and Madagascar at a depth of 300 m.

References

External links
 To World Register of Marine Species

discus
Gastropods described in 1987